Bailey Biondi-Odo (born 6 December 2001) is an Australian professional rugby league footballer who plays as a  or .

He previously played for the Canterbury-Bankstown Bulldogs in the NRL.

Background
Biondi-Odo was born in Mount Isa, Queensland, Australia, and is of Aboriginal Australian, Papua New Guinean, Italian and English descent.

Playing career
In round 16 of the 2021 NRL season, Biondi-Odo made his debut for the Canterbury Bulldogs against the Manly Warringah Sea Eagles which ended in a 66–0 defeat at Western Sydney Stadium.

In round 18 of the 2021 NRL season, he scored his first try in the NRL during Canterbury's 32–24 loss against the South Sydney Rabbitohs.
Biondi-Odo made nine appearances for Canterbury in the 2021 NRL season as the club finished last on the table and collected the Wooden Spoon.

References

External links
Canterbury Bulldogs profile

2001 births
Living people
Australian rugby league players
Australian people of Papua New Guinean descent
Australian people of Italian descent
Australian people of English descent
Canterbury-Bankstown Bulldogs players
Indigenous Australian rugby league players
Rugby league halfbacks
Rugby league hookers
Rugby league players from Mount Isa